Lorena Velázquez (born December 15, 1937) is a Mexican actress and former beauty pageant titleholder.

Biography
Born María de la Concepción Lorena Villar in Mexico City, Velázquez debuted in 1955. She competed in Miss Mexico in 1958 and placed second. Afterwards she was appointed Miss Mexico 1960, although she refused to represent Mexico in the Miss Universe pageant.

Velázquez played varied roles in the 60's, from a vedette, to a cowgirl and even as the queen of vampires. She also played two antagonic roles in a film, as queen of a far away planet and her twin (picture). In the 70's, she made the transition to television. Since then, she has alternated between the large and small screens.

She is the step-daughter of actor Víctor Velázquez and older sister of actress Teresa Velázquez.

Filmography

Television shows
 Mujer, casos de la vida real (1985–2007)
 Trauma infantil (2001)
 Encuentro con el alma (2002)
Como dice el dicho (2011) as Dianita

Telenovelas (soap operas)
 Cumbres Borrascosas (1964) - Cathy
 Estafa de amor (1967) as Mayte
 Dulce desafío (1989) as Aida
 Mi pequeña traviesa (1997) as Catalina
 El privilegio de amar (1998) as Rebeca
 Alma rebelde (1999) as Natalia
 La casa en la playa (2000) as Elena White
 Amigas y rivales (2001) as Itzel de la Colina
 Velo de novia (2003) as Adela Isabela
 Rubí (2004) as Mary Chavarria Gonsalez
 Muchachitas como tu (2007) as Teresa Linares
 Alma de hierro (2008) as Victoria
 Niña de mi corazón (2010) as Mercedes Riquelme
 Dos Hogares (2011-2012) as Carmela De Valtierra
 Mentir para vivir (2013)
 Que Pobres Tan Ricos (2014) as Chabelita
 Amores con trampa (2015) as Corina Bocelli
 La mexicana y el güero (2020) as Rose Somers

Films

 Caras nuevas (1955) as Waitress
 La Diana cazadora (1956) as Margarita
 The New World (1957)
 El Puma (1958) as Margarita
 La ley del más rápido (1958) as Margarita
 A tiro limpio (1958) as Margarita
 Tin Tan y las modelos (1959) as Rosita
The Life of Agustín Lara (1959) as María Islas
 Ellas también son rebeldes (1959) as Irene Barreto
 La nave de los monstruos (1960) as Beta
 El rapto de las sabinas (1960) as Hersilia
 Ay Chabela! (1961) as Jenny 
 Santo contra los zombies (1961) as Gloria Sandoval
 Santo vs. las mujeres vampiro (1962) as Zorina
 Las luchadoras vs. El Médico Asesino (1962) as Gloria Venus
 Milagros de San Martín de Porres (1963) as Minerva
 Tintansón Crusoe (1964) as Zoraya Caluya
 El hacha diabólica (1964) as Isabel de Arango
 Atacan las brujas (1964) as Elisa Cárdenas
 El planeta de las mujeres invasoras (1966) as Adastrea
 Fray Don Juan (1969) as Claudia
 Misión suicida (1971) as Ana Silvia
 El tesoro de Morgan (1974) as Dalia
 La Chilindrina en apuros (1994) as Doña Aldunza
 Reclusorio (1995) as Reina de la Garza

Further reading
AGRASÁNCHEZ, Jr., Rogelio (2001). Bellezas del cine mexicano/Beauties of Mexican Cinema. México: *Archivo Fílmico Agrasánchez. 
VARIOS (2002). Lorena Velázquez, reina del cine fantástico. En SOMOS. México: Editorial Televisa, S. A. de C.V.

External links

Living people
1937 births
Mexican beauty pageant winners
Mexican film actresses
Mexican telenovela actresses
Mexican television actresses
Actresses from Mexico City